Blobitecture (from blob architecture), blobism and blobismus are terms for a movement in architecture in which buildings have an organic, amoeba-shaped, building form. Though the term blob architecture was in vogue already in the mid-1990s, the word blobitecture first appeared in print in 2002, in William Safire's "On Language" column in the New York Times Magazine in an article entitled "Defenestration". Though intended in the article to have a derogatory meaning, the word stuck and is often used to describe buildings with curved and rounded shapes.

Origins of the term "blob architecture"
The term "blob" was used by the Czech-British architect Jan Kaplický for the first time for the "Blob Office Building" in London in 1986. The building was characterized by organic, aerodynamic shape and advanced technological and energy-saving solutions. The term 'blob architecture' was coined by architect Greg Lynn in 1995 in his experiments in digital design with metaball graphical software. Soon a range of architects and furniture designers began to experiment with this "blobby" software to create new and unusual forms. Despite its seeming organicism, blob architecture is unthinkable without this and other similar computer-aided design programs. Architects derive the forms by manipulating the algorithms of the computer modeling platform. Some other computer aided design functions involved in developing this are the nonuniform rational B-spline or NURB, freeform surfaces, and the digitizing of sculpted forms by means akin to computed tomography.

Precedents
One precedent is Archigram, a group of English architects working in the 1960s, to which Peter Cook belonged. They were interested in inflatable architecture as well as in the shapes that could be generated from plastic. Ron Herron, also a member of Archigram, created blob-like architecture in his projects from the 1960s, such as Walking Cities and Instant City, as did Michael Webb with Sin Centre.   Buckminster Fuller's work with geodesic domes provided both stylistic and structural precedents. Geodesic domes form the building blocks for works including The Eden Project. Niemeyer's Edificio Copan built in 1957 undulates nonsymetrically invoking the irregular non-linearity often seen in blobitecture. There was a climate of experimental architecture with an air of psychedelia in the 1970s that these were a part of.   The Flintstone House by William Nicholson in 1976, was built over large inflated balloons. Frederick Kiesler's unbuilt, Endless House is another instance of early blob-like architecture, although it is symmetrical in plan and designed before computers; his design for the Shrine of the Book (construction begun, 1965) which has the characteristic droplet form of fluid also anticipates forms that interest architects today. Similarly, one would have to include the work of Vittorio Giorgini (Casa Saldarini), Pascal Haüsermann and especially that of Antti Lovag as examples of successfully built blobs. The latter built the famous Palais Bulles close to Cannes on the French Côte d'Azur, owned by fashion designer Pierre Cardin.

Also to be considered, if one views blob architecture from the question of form rather than technology, are the organic designs of Antoni Gaudi in Barcelona and of the Expressionists like Bruno Taut and Hermann Finsterlin. Lastly, the emergence of new aesthetic-oriented architectural theories like OOO have led to contemporary architects explicitly examine the formal-technological-theoretical implications of blobitecture, including digital-physical augmented reality works of architects like iheartblob.

Built examples

The term, especially in popular parlance, has come to be associated quite widely with odd-looking buildings including Frank Gehry's Guggenheim Museum Bilbao (1997) and the Experience Music Project (2000). These, in the narrower sense, are not blob buildings, even though they were designed by advanced computer-aided design tools, CATIA in particular. The reason for this is that they were designed from physical models rather than from computer manipulations. The first full blob building, however, was built in the Netherlands by Lars Spuybroek (NOX) and Kas Oosterhuis. Called the Water Pavilion (1993–1997), it has a fully computer-based shape manufactured with computer-aided tools and an electronic interactive interior where sound and light can be transformed by the visitor.

A building that also can be considered an example of a blob is Peter Cook and Colin Fournier's Kunsthaus (2003) in Graz, Austria. Other instances are Roy Mason's Xanadu House (1979), and a rare excursion into the field by Herzog & de Meuron in their Allianz Arena (2005).  By 2005, Norman Foster had involved himself in blobitecture to some extent as well with his brain-shaped design for the Philological Library at the Free University of Berlin and the Sage Gateshead opened in 2004. French-born architect  build the free shaped Biomorphic House (2012)in Israel.

Gallery

See also
Blobject

References

Sources
Lynn, Greg. Folds, Bodies & Blobs : Collected Essays. La Lettre volée, 1998. ISBN
Muschamp, Herbert. The New York Times, Architecture's Claim on the Future: The Blob. July 23, 2000.
Safire, Wiliam. The New York Times: On Language. Defenestration. December 1, 2002.
Waters, John K. Blobitecture: Waveform Architecture and Digital Design. Rockport Publishers, 2003. ISBN

 

 
 
20th-century architectural styles
21st-century architectural styles